José María Basanta (born 3 April 1984) is an Argentine former professional footballer who played as a defender. Basanta holds Mexican citizenship.

He began his career with Estudiantes in Argentina, after a breakout performance at the 2008 Copa Libertadores he was transferred to Monterrey, where he was an important part in the team's Liga MX and CONCACAF Champions League successes under coach Victor Manuel Vucetich and after the departure of Luis Perez in 2012 he became club captain, he was transferred to italian club ACF Fiorentina following the 2014 FIFA World Cup where he represented Argentina as the team finished runners-up to Germany.

After an underwhelming spell in Italy he returned to Monterrey in the summer of 2015 and was once again named club captain under coach Antonio Mohamed, and later Diego Alonso

Career 
Basanta started his career with Estudiantes in 2003 before joining Olimpo de Bahía Blanca of the Argentine 2nd Division in 2006. Basanta helped Olimpo to win both the Apertura and Clausura to secure automatic promotion to the Primera Division.

He rejoined Estudiantes in 2007 and stayed a year with them.

In June 2008, he was sold to Monterrey, by a request of the team's manager, Ricardo La Volpe. Since then, Basanta has been a regular in the first team, winning the 2009 Apertura championship and the 2010 Apertura championship.

On 31 August 2015, it was announced that Basanta would be returning to Rayados de Monterrey in a season-long loan deal.

On 5 September 2020, Basanta announced on his official Instagram that he will be retiring from professional football.

Honours

Club
Olimpo
Primera B Nacional (2): Apertura 2006, Clausura 2007

Monterrey
Liga MX (3): Apertura 2009, Apertura 2010, Apertura 2019
Copa MX (1): Apertura 2017
InterLiga (1): 2010
CONCACAF Champions League (4): 2010–11, 2011–12, 2012–13, 2019

International
Argentina
FIFA World Cup runner-up: 2014

Individual
 Best Center back of the tournament: Apertura 2010
 Best Center back of the tournament: Clausura 2012

References

External links

Guardian statistics
Football lineups player profile

Living people
1984 births
Sportspeople from Buenos Aires Province
Association football defenders
Argentine footballers
Argentine expatriate footballers
Naturalized citizens of Mexico
Estudiantes de La Plata footballers
Olimpo footballers
C.F. Monterrey players
ACF Fiorentina players
Argentine Primera División players
Liga MX players
Serie A players
Expatriate footballers in Mexico
Expatriate footballers in Italy
Argentina international footballers
2014 FIFA World Cup players